Dejan Vukomanović (born 31 October 1990) is a Bosnian-Herzegovinian football midfielder who most recently played for BSK Borča.

Club career
Born in Tuzla, SR Bosnia and Herzegovina, then still within Yugoslavia, Vukomanović played in Serbia with FK Palilulac in the Serbian League Belgrade since 2006 until he signed with BSK Borča in summer 2011 and played with them in the first half of the 2011–12 Serbian SuperLiga. In January 2015, he signed a two and half year-contract with Zrinjski Mostar, but was loaned to Olimpik in January 2016.

In summer 2016 he joined Israeli club Hapoel Katamon Jerusalem, but he returned to Olimpik Sarajevo in January 2017.

References

External links
 
 Dejan Vukomanović stats at utakmica.rs 
 

1990 births
Living people
Sportspeople from Tuzla
Serbs of Bosnia and Herzegovina
Association football midfielders
Serbian footballers
Bosnia and Herzegovina footballers
FK Palilulac Beograd players
FK BSK Borča players
FC Gandzasar Kapan players
HŠK Zrinjski Mostar players
FK Inđija players
FK Olimpik players
Hapoel Katamon Jerusalem F.C. players
FK Novi Pazar players
FC Ararat Yerevan players
Serbian First League players
Serbian SuperLiga players
Liga Leumit players
Armenian Premier League players
Bosnia and Herzegovina expatriate footballers
Expatriate footballers in Serbia
Bosnia and Herzegovina expatriate sportspeople in Serbia
Expatriate footballers in Armenia
Bosnia and Herzegovina expatriate sportspeople in Armenia
Expatriate footballers in Israel
Bosnia and Herzegovina expatriate sportspeople in Israel